Major General Sir David Boswell Egerton, 16th Baronet,  (24 July 1914 – 17 November 2010) was a British Army officer from the aristocratic Egerton family.

Family
Egerton's immediate family was a cadet branch of the ancient and noble Egerton family seated at Oulton since the Middle Ages. His father, Wion de Malpas Egerton, was born in the Punjab in 1879 and joined the Royal Navy, receiving the Distinguished Service Order in 1917 and later being appointed vice admiral. Admiral Egerton died in 1943 whilst his mother Anita, only daughter of Major Albert Rudolph David, died in 1972. His grandfather, uncle of Sir Philip Grey-Egerton, 14th Baronet, was Field Marshal Sir Charles Egerton, formerly an Indian Army officer.

Career
Egerton was commissioned in the Royal Artillery and served with distinction in the Second World War. A career soldier, he was Director-General of Artillery in the Ministry of Defence (1964–67), Vice-President and Senior Army Member Ordnance Board (1967–69), President (1969–70) and Colonel Commandant of the Royal Artillery until 1975. After being promoted to the rank of major general he retired from the British Army and was appointed Secretary-General of the Association of Recognised English Language Services (1971–79).

Personal life
On 10 April 1946, Egerton married Margaret Gillian (died 24 August 2004), youngest daughter of the Revd Canon Charles Cuthbert Inge, Rector of Streatley, Berkshire. 

In 2008 Egerton succeeded his second cousin, Sir John Grey-Egerton, 15th Baronet, in the family title. Having been known for many years as "Major General Egerton", he chose not to assume the style of "Sir David Egerton".

Egerton and his wife had three children; William (now Sir William Egerton Bt, born 1949), who succeeded his father in the baronetcy upon the latter's death in 2010, and two daughters, Charlotte now Dixon (born 1950) and Caroline now White (born 1955).

External links
 Egerton heraldry

References

1914 births
2010 deaths
People from Grimsby
Military personnel from Lincolnshire
British people in colonial India
Graduates of the Royal Military Academy, Woolwich
People educated at Stowe School
British Army personnel of World War II
Royal Artillery officers
British Army major generals
Officers of the Order of the British Empire
Recipients of the Military Cross
Companions of the Order of the Bath
Baronets in the Baronetage of England
David